Tavreh (also Romanized as Ţavreh; also known as Ţarveh) is a village in Qarah Quyun-e Shomali Rural District, in the Central District of Showt County, West Azerbaijan Province, Iran. At the 2006 census, its population was 414, in 84 families.

References 

Populated places in Showt County